Hustla's Handbook is the seventh solo studio album by American rapper Mack 10. It was released on September 27, 2005 via Hoo-Bangin'/Capitol Records. Production was handled by Bruce Waynne, Dirty Swift, DL, Fredwreck, J Classic, Ron "Neff-U" Feemstar, Lil' Sin, MD Productions, MyGuyMars, Rance, Young Soprano ( Deviossi), and Young Tre. It features guest appearances from Wanted, Butch Cassidy, Bigga Brown, B-Real, Bre Perry, Chingy, DJ, DL, Kanary Diamonds, Nate Dogg, Pastor Steven Hamilton, Red Café, Ruka Puff and Traci Nelson. The album debuted at number 65 on the Billboard 200 and number 13 on the Top R&B/Hip-Hop Albums in the United States. Its lead single, "Like This", was an underground success and was also used in the soundtrack for Vondie Curtis-Hall's 2006 film Waist Deep.

Track listing

Notes
Tracks 5, 7 and 15 features vocals from Traci Nelson
Track 12 features backing vocals from Isaac Reese
Track 15 features vocals from Lashann Dendy and Nikisha Grier
Track 16 is listed as a bonus track

Sample credits
Track 8 contains samples from "Man's Temptation" written by Curtis Mayfield and performed by Isaac Hayes

Personnel

Dedrick "Mack 10" Rolison – main performer, executive producer
Nathaniel "Nate Dogg" Hale – featured artist (track 1)
Andrew "Deviossi"/"Young Soprano" Price II – featured artist (tracks: 3-6, 12, 13), producer (track 2)
Jimmy "Skoop Delania" Tucker – featured artist (tracks: 3, 5, 13)
Jermaine "Red Café" Denny – featured artist (track 3)
Deshaun "DL" Taylor – featured artist (track 5), producer (tracks: 4, 16)
Pastor Steven Hamilton – featured artist (track 6)
Louis "B-Real" Freese – featured artist (track 7)
DJ – featured artist (track 7)
Danny "Butch Cassidy" Means – featured artist (tracks: 8, 12)
Byron "Ruka Puff" Waters – featured artist (track 9)
Jay "Bigga Brown" – featured artist (track 9)
Bre Perry – featured artist (track 11)
Johnean "Kanary Diamonds" Jimenez – featured artist (track 13)
Howard "Chingy" Bailey Jr. – featured artist (track 16)
Traci Nelson – vocals (tracks: 5, 7, 15)
Lashann Dendy – vocals (track 15)
Nikisha Grier – vocals (track 15)
Isaac Reese – backing vocals (track 12)
Farid "Fredwreck" Nassar – keyboards (tracks: 2, 7, 15), flute (track 7), guitar (track 15), producer (tracks: 7, 15), recording (track 1), mixing (tracks: 1-12, 15), executive producer
Erick Todd Coomes – bass & guitar (track 7)
The Velvet Orchestra – strings (track 7)
Andre Taylor – producer (track 1)
Louis Harden – producer (track 1)
Lamar "MyGuyMars" Edwards – producer (track 3)
Larrance "Rance" Dopson – producer (track 3)
Theron "Neff-U" Feemster – producer (tracks: 5, 6)
Waynne "Bruce Waynne" Nugent – producer (tracks: 8, 11)
Kevin "Dirty Swift" Risto – producer (tracks: 8, 11)
Sherman "Lil Sin" Houston – producer (track 9)
Jeremy Cranon – producer (tracks: 10, 13)
Shaheim Smith – producer (tracks: 10, 13)
Treyvon "Young Tre" Green – producer (track 12)
Ken Koroshetz – recording (tracks: 2-13, 15, 16), mixing (tracks: 13, 16)
Brian "Big Bass" Gardner – mastering
Andrew Shack – co-executive producer
Rob Abeyta – design
Estevan Oriol – photography
Candyce Handley – A&R
Kevin Faist – A&R

Charts

References

External links

2005 albums
Mack 10 albums
Capitol Records albums
Albums produced by Fredwreck
Albums produced by Midi Mafia
Albums produced by Mars (record producer)